The Organization of the League of Communists in the Yugoslav People's Army was the branch of the League of Communists of Yugoslavia (SKJ) for members of the Yugoslav People's Army.

Description
The Organization of the League of Communists generally constituted a conservative grouping within party organizations. At the organization's final IX. Conference in Belgrade in November 1989, the head of the organization's committee Admiral Petar Šimić spoke out against multi-party democracy.

After the dissolution of the League of Communists of Yugoslavia in January 1990, the Organization of the League of Communists was reformed as the League of Communists – Movement for Yugoslavia in November 1990.

See also
Yugoslav People's Army
League of Communists of Yugoslavia
Socialist Federal Republic of Yugoslavia

References

Notes

Footnotes

Bibliography

 
 

Yugoslav People's Army
League of Communists of Yugoslavia